Bayevsky District is an administrative and municipal district (raion), one of the fifty-nine in Altai Krai, Russia. It is located in the northwest of the krai. Its administrative center is the rural locality (a selo) of Bayevo. Population:  The population of Bayevo accounts for 42.9% of the district's total population.

Geography
Bayevsky District is located in the northwest of Altay Krai.  The area is on a rolling steppe landscape of the Ob River plain.  The Ob River itself reaches to within 40 km of the district, to the northwest.  On the territory is over 130 lakes and reservoirs.  The soil is black earth, and there are salt marshes.  The north has birch groves, the east of the district has mixed-forests, and the west is steppe. Bayevsky District is about 220 km southwest of the city of Novosibirsk, 170 km west of the regional city of Barnaul, and 2,750 km east of Moscow.  The area measures 50 km (north-south), and 65 km (west-east); total area is 2,740 km2 (about 2% of Altai Krai).  The administrative center is the town of Bayevo, in the north-center of the district at a junction of the main north-south and west-east roads.

The district is bordered on the north by Pankrushikhinsky District and Kamensky District, on the east by Tyumentsevsky District, on the south by Zavyalovsky District, and on the west by Suetsky District.

References

Notes

Sources

Districts of Altai Krai